Crassispira oliva is a species of sea snail, a marine gastropod mollusk in the family Pseudomelatomidae.

Description
The length of the shell attains 32 mm.

Distribution
This marine species occurs off the Democratic Republic of the Congo and Angola

References

 Fernandes, F., Rolán, E. & Otero-Schmitt, J. (1995) The genus Crassispira (Gastropoda, Turridae) in West Africa. Journal of Conchology, 35, 283–301.

External links
 
 

}

oliva
Gastropods described in 1995